The Boii (Latin plural, singular Boius) were a Celtic tribe of the later Iron Age, attested at various times in Cisalpine Gaul (Northern Italy), Pannonia (Hungary), parts of Bavaria, in and around Bohemia (after whom the region is named in most languages; comprising the bulk of today's Czech Republic), parts of Poland, and Gallia Narbonensis (located in modern Languedoc and Provence).

In addition, the archaeological evidence indicates that in the 2nd century BC Celts expanded from Bohemia through the Kłodzko Valley into Silesia, now part of Poland and the Czech Republic.

They first appear in history in connection with the Gallic invasion of northern Italy, 390 BC, when they made the Etruscan city of Felsina their new capital, Bononia (Bologna). 

After a series of wars they were decisively beaten by the Romans in the Battle of Mutina (193 BC) and their territory became part of the Roman province of Cisalpine Gaul. According to Strabo, writing two centuries after the events, rather than being destroyed by the Romans like their Celtic neighbours,

Around 60 BC, a group of Boii joined the Helvetiis' ill-fated attempt to conquer land in western Gaul and were defeated by Julius Caesar, along with their allies, in the Battle of Bibracte.

Caesar settled the remnants of that group in Gorgobina, from where they sent 2,000 warriors to Vercingetorix's aid at the Battle of Alesia six years later. The eastern Boii on the Danube were incorporated into the Roman Empire in 8 AD.

Etymology and name
From all the different names of the same Celtic people in literature and inscriptions it is possible to abstract a Continental Celtic segment, .

There are two major derivations of this segment, both presupposing that it belongs to the family of Indo-European languages: from 'cow' and from 'warrior.' The Boii would thus be either 'the herding people' or 'the warrior people'.

The 'cow' derivation depends most immediately on the Old Irish legal term for 'outsider': ambue, from Proto-Celtic  (<*an-bouios), 'not a cattle owner'.

In a reference to the first known historical Boii, Polybius relates that their wealth consisted of cattle and gold, that they depended on agriculture and war, and that a man's status depended on the number of associates and assistants he had.

Such a connection is possible if the original form of Boii belonged to a tribe of Proto-Indo-European speakers long before the time of the historic Boii. If that is the case, then the Celtic tribe of central Europe must have been a final daughter population of a linguistically diversified ancestor tribe.

The same wider connections can be hypothesized for the 'cow' derivation: the Boeotians have been known for well over a century as a people of kine, which might have been parallel to the meaning of Italy as 'land of calves'.

Contemporary derived words include Boiorix ('king of the Boii', one of the chieftains of the Cimbri) and Boiodurum ('gate/fort of the Boii', modern Passau) in Germany.

History

Settlement in north Italy
According to the ancient authors, the Boii arrived in northern Italy by crossing the Alps. While of the other tribes who had come to Italy along with the Boii, the Senones, Lingones and Cenomani are also attested in Gaul at the time of the Roman conquest. It remains therefore unclear where exactly the Central Europe origins of the Boii lay, if somewhere in Gaul, Southern Germany or in Bohemia.

Polybius relates that the Celts were close neighbors of the Etruscan civilization and "cast covetous eyes on their beautiful country".

Invading the Po Valley with a large army, they drove out the Etruscans and resettled it, the Boii taking the right bank in the center of the valley. Strabo confirms that the Boii emigrated from their lands across the Alps and were one of the largest tribes of the Celts. The Boii occupied the old Etruscan settlement of Felsina, which they named Bononia (modern Bologna). Polybius describes the Celtic way of life in Cisalpine Gaul as follows:

The archaeological evidence from Bologna and its vicinity contradicts the testimony of Polybius and Livy on some points, who say the Boii expelled the Etruscans and perhaps some were forced to leave.

It indicates the Boii neither destroyed nor depopulated Felsinum, but simply moved in and became part of the population by intermarriage. 

The cemeteries of the period in Bologna contain La Tène weapons and other artifacts, as well as Etruscan items such as bronze mirrors. At Monte Bibele not far away one grave contained La Tène weapons and a pot with an Etruscan female name scratched on it.

War against Rome
In the second half of the 3rd century BC, the Boii allied with the other Cisalpine Gauls and the Etruscans against Rome. They also fought alongside Hannibal, killing the Roman general Lucius Postumius Albinus in 216 BC, whose skull was then turned into a sacrificial bowl.

A short time earlier, they had been defeated at the Battle of Telamon in 225 BC, and were again at Placentia in 194 BC (modern Piacenza) and Mutina in 193 BC (modern Modena). Publius Cornelius Scipio Nasica completed the Roman conquest of the Boii in 191 BC, celebrating a triumph for it. After their losses, according to Strabo, a large portion of the Boii left Italy.

Boii on the Danube
Contrary to the interpretation of the classical writers, the Pannonian Boii attested in later sources are not simply the remnants of those who had fled from Italy, but rather another division of the tribe, which had settled there much earlier.

The burial rites of the Italian Boii show many similarities with contemporary Bohemia, such as inhumation, which was uncommon with the other Cisalpine Gauls, or the absence of the typically western Celtic torcs.

This makes it much more likely that the Cisalpine Boii had actually originated from Bohemia rather than the other way round.

Having migrated to Italy from north of the Alps, some of the defeated Celts simply moved back to their kinsfolk.

The Pannonian Boii are mentioned again in the late 2nd century BC when they repelled the Cimbri and Teutones (Strabo VII, 2, 2). Later on, they attacked the city of Noreia (in modern Austria) shortly before a group of Boii (32,000 according to Julius Caesar – the number is probably an exaggeration) joined the Helvetii in their attempt to settle in western Gaul.

After the Helvetian defeat at Bibracte, the influential Aedui tribe allowed the Boii survivors to settle on their territory, where they occupied the oppidum of Gorgobina. Although attacked by Vercingetorix during one phase of the war, they supported him with two thousand troops at the battle of Alesia (Caesar, Commentarii de Bello Gallico, VII, 75).

Again, other parts of the Boii had remained closer to their traditional home, and settled in the Slovak and Hungarian lowlands by the Danube and the Mura, with a centre at Bratislava.

Around 60 BC they clashed with the rising power of the Dacians under their king Burebista and were defeated. When the Romans finally conquered Pannonia in 8 AD, the Boii seem not to have opposed them. Their former territory was now called deserta Boiorum (deserta meaning 'empty or sparsely populated lands').

However, the Boii had not been exterminated: There was a civitas Boiorum et Azaliorum (the Azalii being a neighbouring tribe) which was under the jurisdiction of a prefect of the Danube shore (praefectus ripae Danuvii). This , a common Roman administrative term designating both a city and the tribal district around it, was later adjoined to the city of Carnuntum.

The Boii in ancient sources

Plautus
Plautus refers to the Boii in Captivi:

There is a play on words: Boia means 'woman of the Boii', also 'convicted criminal's restraint collar'.

Livy
In volume 21 of his History of Rome, Livy (59 BC – 17 AD) claims that it was a Boio man that offered to show Hannibal the way across the Alps.

Inscriptions
In the first century BC, the Boii living in an oppidum of Bratislava minted Biatecs, high-quality coins with inscriptions (probably the names of kings) in Latin letters. This is the only "written source" provided by the Boii themselves.

Notes

Sources

Bibliography
 
 
 
 
 
 
 

 
Ancient Slovakia
History of Bohemia
Ancient tribes in Hungary
Gauls
Prehistory of the Czech lands
Historical Celtic peoples
Gallia Narbonensis